Knowledge of the location of Earth has been shaped by 400 years of telescopic observations, and has expanded radically since the start of the 20th century. Initially, Earth was believed to be the center of the Universe,
which consisted only of those planets visible with the naked eye and an outlying sphere of fixed stars. After the acceptance of the heliocentric model in the 17th century, observations by William Herschel and others showed that the Sun lay within a vast, disc-shaped galaxy of stars. By the 20th century, observations of spiral nebulae revealed that the Milky Way galaxy was one of billions in an expanding universe, grouped into clusters and superclusters. By the end of the 20th century, the overall structure of the visible universe was becoming clearer, with superclusters forming into a vast web of filaments and voids. Superclusters, filaments and voids are the largest coherent structures in the Universe that we can observe. At still larger scales (over 1000 megaparsecs) the Universe becomes homogeneous, meaning that all its parts have on average the same density, composition and structure.

Since there is believed to be no "center" or "edge" of the Universe, there is no particular reference point with which to plot the overall location of the Earth in the universe. Because the observable universe is defined as that region of the Universe visible to terrestrial observers, Earth is, because of the constancy of the speed of light, the center of Earth's observable universe. Reference can be made to the Earth's position with respect to specific structures, which exist at various scales. It is still undetermined whether the Universe is infinite. There have been numerous hypotheses that the known universe may be only one such example within a higher multiverse; however, no direct evidence of any sort of multiverse has been observed, and some have argued that the hypothesis is not falsifiable.

Details

Table

Gallery

See also

 Cosmic View
 Cosmic Zoom
 Galaxy Song
 History of the center of the Universe
 Orders of magnitude (length)
 Pale Blue Dot
 Powers of Ten (film)
 List of nearest stars and brown dwarfs
 Solar System § Galactic context

Notes

References

Location in the Universe
Physical cosmology